Andrew Davies (born 17 July 1967) is a British weightlifter. He competed in the men's heavyweight II event at the 1988 Summer Olympics.

References

External links
 

1967 births
Living people
British male weightlifters
Olympic weightlifters of Great Britain
Weightlifters at the 1988 Summer Olympics
People from Caldicot, Monmouthshire
Sportspeople from Monmouthshire
World Weightlifting Championships medalists
Commonwealth Games medallists in weightlifting
Commonwealth Games gold medallists for Wales
Commonwealth Games bronze medallists for Wales
Weightlifters at the 1986 Commonwealth Games
Weightlifters at the 1990 Commonwealth Games
Medallists at the 1986 Commonwealth Games
Medallists at the 1990 Commonwealth Games